Elena Esposito (Milan 1960) is an Italian sociologist who works in the field of social systems theory. She teaches general sociology at Bielefeld University (Germany) and prediction and the future of public policy at the University of Bologna (Italy). Her research is embedded in Luhmannian social systems theory.

Education 
Elena Esposito studied sociology at the University of Bologna (1983). At the same university she earned a Laurea in Philosophy under the supervision of Umberto Eco (1987). She earned a PhD in Sociology at the Bielefeld University with a thesis on the operation of observation in constructivism. Her PhD supervisor was Niklas Luhmann.

Research 
Elena Esposito's research focuses on five main topics:
 General systems theory
 Social memory
 Fashion
 Finance
 Algorithms & web

Academic appointments 
Elena Esposito is Full Professor at the Fakultät für Soziologie of the University Bielefeld and Full Professor at the Department of Political and Social Sciences of the University of Bologna. She was visiting scholar at the Max Planck Institute for the History of Science, Berlin (2017) and Niklas Luhmann Distinguished Visiting Chair in Social Theory, University Bielefeld (2015–16). Elena Esposito is member of the editorial board of Sociologica (since 2014). She was member of the board of Soziale Systeme (2000–2006). She is also evaluator of the Deutscher Akademischer Austausch Dienst (DAAD) (since 2015) and advisor of the Zentrum für interdisziplinären Forschung (ZiF) of the University Bielefeld (since 2014). In 2019 Elena Esposito received an advanced grant by the European Research Council for the research project "The Future of Prediction: Social Consequences of Algorithmic Forecast in Insurance, Medicine and Policing" (PREDICT - ERC-2018-ADG, n. 833749).

Publications

Books (selection)
 Artificial Communication: How Algorithms Produce Social Intelligence. Cambridge (MA): The MIT Press, 2022.
 Ontologien der Moderne (with René John and Jana Rückert-John, eds.), Wiesbaden: Springer VS,  2013.
 Il futuro dei futures. Il tempo del denaro nella finanza e nella società. Pisa: ETS,  2009. (German translation Die Zukunft der Futures. Die Zeit des Geldes in Finanzwelt und Gesellschaft. Heidelberg: Carl Auer , 2010. English translation The Future of Futures. The Time of Money in Financing and Society. Cheltenham: Edward Elgar, 2011.)
 Die Fiktion der wahrscheinlichen Realität. Frankfurt a.M.: Suhrkamp 2007 (revised Italian translation Probabilità improbabili. La realtà della finzione nella società moderna. Roma: Meltemi,  2008.) 
  Die Verbindlichkeit des Vorübergehenden. Paradoxien der Mode. Suhrkamp: Frankfurt a.M., 2004. (Italian translation I paradossi della moda. Originalità e transitorietà nella società moderna. Bologna: Baskerville, 2004.) 
 La memoria sociale. Mezzi per comunicare e modi di dimenticare, Laterza, Roma-Bari, 2001 (extended German translation Soziales Vergessen. Formen und Medien des Gedächtnisses der Gesellschaft. Frankfurt a.M.: Suhrkamp 2002.)
 Luhmann In Glossario (with Claudio Baraldi and Giancarlo Corsi). Milano: Angeli, 1995 (Japanese translation Tokio: Kokubun-sha, 2013; German translation GLU. Glossar zu Niklas Luhmanns Theorie sozialer Systeme. Suhrkamp, Frankfurt a.M.,1997; Spanish translation GLU. Glosario sobre la teorìa social de Niklas Luhmann. Città del Messico-Gaudalajara-Barcellona: Universidad Iberoamericana, 1996; Korean and English translations forthcoming.)
 L’operazione di osservazione, Milano: Angeli,  1992.

Articles (selection)
 Critique without crisis: Systems theory as a critical sociology. Thesis Eleven 2017, 143(1): 18–27. https://doi.org/10.1177/0725513617740966 
 Organizing without Understanding? Lists in Ancient and in Digital Cultures. Zeitschrift fur Literaturwissenschaft und  Linguistik, 2017. https://doi.org/10.1007/s41244-017-0064-4.
 Artificial Communication? The Production of Contingency by Algorithms. Zeitschrift für Soziologie 2017, 46(4): 249–265. DOI: https://doi.org/10.1515/zfsoz-2017-1014
 An ecology of differences: Communication, the Web, and the question of borders. Pp. 283–301 in Erich Hörl and James Burton (Eds.), General Ecology. The New Ecological Paradigm. London/New York: Bloomsbury, 2017.
 Algorithmic memory and the right to be forgotten on the web. Big Data & Society, January–June 2017. DOI: 10.1177/2053951717703996.
 The fascination of contingency: Fashion and modern society. Pp. 175–190 in Giovanni Matteucci and Stefano Marino (Eds.), Philosophical perspectives on fashion. London/New York: Bloomsbury, 2017.
 Tools to Remember an Ever-changing Past. Pp. 335–344 in Alberto Cevolini (Ed.), Forgetting Machines: Knowledge Management Evolution in Early Modern Europe. Leiden/Boston: Brill, 2016. 
 ルーマン後の社会システム論と現代社会学(Ruman go no shakaishisutemuron to gendai shakaigaku). 現代思想, 2014(42–16): 75–85.  
 Algorithmische Kontingenz. Der Umgang mit Unsicherheit im Web. pp. 233–249 in Alberto Cevolini, ed. Die Ordnung des Kontingenten. Beiträge zur zahlenmäßigen Selbstbeschreibung der modernen Gesellschaft. Wiesbaden: Springer VS, 2014.
 Economic Circularities and Second-Order Observation: The Reality of Ratings. Sociologica, 2/2013. doi: 10.2383/74851.
 Зацикленность экономики и наблюдения второго порядка: реальность рейтингов. Russian translation Экономическая социология. Т. 14. № 4. Сентябрь 2013(14): 58–74.
 The structures of uncertainty. Performativity and unpredictability in economic operations. Economy & Society, 2013(42): 102–129.

Other texts (selection)
 Die Frivolität des Engagements und das Dilemma der ethnischen und frommen Mode. Frankfurter Allgemeine Quarterly, 2017 (3): 82–85.
 Realität der Zukunft und künftige Realität. Pp. 29–35 in Susanne Witzgall and Kerstin Stakemeier (Eds.), Die Gegenwart der Zukunft. Zürich-Berlin: Diaphanes, 2016.
 “Pläne helfen nicht, die geplante Zukunft zu realisieren”. Im Gespräch mit Elena Esposito und Nora Schultz. pp. 36–44 in Susanne Witzgall and Kerstin Stakemeier (Eds.), Die Gegenwart der Zukunft. Zürich-Berlin: Diaphanes, 2016.
 Die Konstruktion der Zeit in der zeitlosen Gegenwart. Frankfurt am Main: Max-Planck-Institut für europäische Rechtsgeschichte, 2007.

References

External links 
 Homepage with several publications
 Homepage Academia.edu
 Future and Uncertainty in Digital Society
 Vortrag: Die Transparenz der Technik in der medialen Kommunikation.
 Vortrag: Zeit der Divination und Zeit des Risikos: Gesellschaftliche Voraussetzungen der Prophetie und der Prognose (Video)
 Vortrag: Was Luhmann vom Internet und von Algorithmen schon wusste? // MECS // Niklas Luhmann am OVG Lüneburg //

Living people
1960 births
Writers from Milan
Italian sociologists
Italian women sociologists
University of Bologna alumni
Bielefeld University alumni
Academic staff of Bielefeld University